The CASHPOINT Arena is a multi-use stadium in Altach, Austria.  It is currently used mostly for football matches and is the home ground of SC Rheindorf Altach.  The stadium holds 8,500 and was built in 1990.

References

Football venues in Austria
Sports venues in Vorarlberg